The 2018 ITTF Team World Cup was a table tennis competition held at the Copper Box Arena in London from 22 to 25 February 2018. It was the 11th edition of the ITTF-sanctioned event, and the first time that it had been held in the United Kingdom.

China won both events, defeating Japan in both the men's and women's team finals.

Medallists

Qualification

The host nation England, and each of the current continental team champions qualified for both the men's and women's events, with additional places awarded to the highest-placed teams at the 2016 World Team Championships that hadn't already qualified through continental events.

Men

Women

Notes

Events

Men's team

Women's team

See also

2018 World Team Table Tennis Championships
2018 ITTF World Tour
2018 ITTF Men's World Cup
2018 ITTF Women's World Cup

References

External links
2018 ITTF Team World Cup
International Table Tennis Federation

 
Team
World Cup (team)
ITTF Team World Cup
ITTF Team World Cup
Table tennis competitions in the United Kingdom
International sports competitions in London
ITTF